The Guerchais-Roche T.35 and T.39 was a small family of two, three and four seat French-built touring monoplanes of the 1940s.

Development

Roche Aviation designed the T.35 during the latter part of World War II as a low-wing touring monoplane with fixed undercarriage. The first example made its maiden flight in September 1944.  After the war's end, Roche built a series of basically similar sub-models with varying powerplants and seating arrangements. The T.35 models were two-seat aircraft and the T.39 models accommodated three or four persons.  Production was terminated after 15 examples of the series had been completed.

Operational history

The T.35 and T.39 series was flown by private pilot owners and by members of French light aero clubs until at least the mid 1960s. Three examples remained on the French civil aircraft register in January 1964. No examples are currently preserved in collections or museums.

Variants

 T.35   Renault 4Pei. One built.
 T.35/I   Renault engine. One built.
 T.35/II   Renault 4P-03. Seven built.
 T.35/III   Regnier 4L-00. One built.
 T.39   Mathis G7R radial. Two built. Three seats.
 T.39/II   Salmson 9ND radial. Two built. Four seats.
 T.55  Fitted with clear-view conopy and powered by  Walter Minor 6-III. One built.

Specifications (T.35/II)

References

Notes

Bibliography

 

1940s French civil utility aircraft
Low-wing aircraft
Single-engined tractor aircraft
Aircraft first flown in 1944